This list is of the Historic Sites of Japan located within the Metropolis of Tōkyō.

National Historic Sites
As of 1 January 2021, fifty-three Sites have been designated as being of national significance (including three *Special Historic Sites).

|-
|}

Prefectural Historic Sites
As of 1 May 2021, three hundred and twenty-nine Sites have been designated as being of prefectural importance.

Municipal Historic Sites
As of 1 May 2020, a further three hundred and forty-one Sites have been designated as being of municipal importance.

Registered Historic Sites
As of 1 January 2021, one Monument has been registered (as opposed to designated) as an Historic Site at a national level.

See also

 Cultural Properties of Japan
 Musashi Province
 History of Tokyo
 Tokyo National Museum
 List of museums in Tokyo
 List of Places of Scenic Beauty of Japan (Tōkyō)
 List of Cultural Properties of Japan - paintings (Tōkyō)
 List of Cultural Properties of Japan - historical materials (Tōkyō)

References

External links
  Cultural Properties in Tokyo
  Cultural Properties in Tokyo

History of Tokyo
 Tokyo
Lists of tourist attractions in Japan